Darke may refer to:

 Dark (alternate spelling)
 Darke (surname)
 Darke County, Ohio
 Darke County Airport
 Darke Lake Provincial Park
 Darke Peak, South Australia
 , US Navy Haskell-class attack transport
 Darke (novel), the sixth book in the child fantasy Septimus Heap series by Angie Sage

See also
 Dark (disambiguation)